Software reliability is the probability of the software causing a system failure over some specified operating time. Software does not fail due to wear out but does fail due to faulty functionality, timing, sequencing, data, and exception handling.  The software fails as a function of operating time as opposed to calendar time.  Over 225 models have been developed since early 1970s, however, several of them have similar if not identical assumptions.  The models have two basic types - prediction modeling and estimation modeling.

1.0 Overview of Software Reliability Prediction Models

These models are derived from actual historical data from real software projects.  The user answers a list of questions which calibrate the historical data to yield a software reliability prediction.  The accuracy of the prediction depends on how many parameters (questions) and datasets are in the model, how current the data is, and how confident the user is of their inputs. One of the earliest prediction models was the Rome Laboratory TR-92-52.  It was developed in 1987 and last updated in 1992 and was geared towards software in avionics systems.  Due to the age of the model and data it's no longer recommended but is the basis for several modern models such as the Shortcut model, Full-scale model, and Neufelder assessment model.  There are also lookup tables for software defect density based on the capability maturity or the application type.  These are very simple models but are generally not as accurate as the assessment based models.                                                                                                                                             

2.0 Overview of Software Reliability Growth (Estimation) Models

Software reliability growth (or estimation) models use failure data from testing to forecast the failure rate or MTBF into the future.  The models depend on the assumptions about the fault rate during testing which can either be increasing, peaking, decreasing or some combination of decreasing and increasing.  Some models assume that there is a finite and fixed number of inherent defects while others assume that it's infinite.  Some models require effort for parameter estimation while others have only a few parameters to estimate.  Some models require the exact time in between each failure found in testing, while others only need to have the number of failures found during any given time interval such as a day.

Software reliability tools implementing some of these models include CASRE (Computer-Aided Software Reliability Estimation) and an open source SFRAT (Software Failure and Reliability Assessment Tool).

References 

Software testing